Mission Sucre (launched in late 2003) is one of the Bolivarian Missions (a series of anti-poverty and social welfare programs) implemented by the late former Venezuelan president Hugo Chávez.  The program provides free and ongoing higher (college and graduate level) education to the two million adult Venezuelans.

Mission Sucre was originally referred to as El Plan Extraordinario Mariscal Antonio José de Sucre, shortened as Misión Sucre. Named after the 18th century independence leader Antonio José de Sucre, Mission Sucre establishes as a strategy the mass education and graduation of university professionals in three years, as opposed to the traditionally mandated five or more years.

Mission Sucre imparts tertiary education; other educational missions include Mission Robinson (for instructing the illiterate) and Mission Ribas (for obtaining secondary studies, classes, and graduation certificates).

See also 
 SUCRE (currency)
 Mission Barrio Adentro
 Bolivarian Revolution

External links 
 Misión Sucre – Official government portal for Mission Sucre.
 Mision Venezuela: Cambio para siempre

Bolivarian missions
Education in Venezuela